Chile mining accident may refer to:

 1945 El Teniente mining accident, the biggest metallic mining accident in history
 2006 Copiapó mining accident, which resulted in two deaths
 2010 Copiapó mining accident, in which 33 miners were trapped for 69 days